Robert Still (10 June 1910 – 13 January 1971) was a wide-ranging English composer of tonal music, who made strong use of dissonance. He produced four symphonies and four string quartets. As a songwriter he set words by Byron, Keats and Shelley.

Life
Still was born in London on 10 June 1910 into a family with a strong interest in music. He was a descendant of John Still, bishop of Bath and Wells. Still was educated at Eton College (1923–29) and Trinity College, Oxford, where he graduated in History and French, and then in music. He had a younger brother who died aged 16 and a sister who emigrated to Australia.

At school and at university Still developed a lifelong interest in racquet sports, including real tennis, in which he won a university sporting blue. Both his father and grandfather were solicitors in a long-established London firm, and he had been intended for the law. He studied music at Oxford under Ernest Walker, Sir Hugh Allen and others (ancestor Peter Still had acted for George III), and then spent two years at the Royal College of Music under C. H. Kitson, Gordon Jacob and the organist Basil Allchin. He also studied under Wilfred Dunwell at Trinity College of Music (modern harmony and counterpoint) and later in life under Hans Keller.

After Oxford, Still returned to Eton to teach music, moving on in 1938 to become conductor and arranger of the Ballet Trois Arts, a travelling company. Having refused a commission, he spent the Second World War first manning a searchlight in the Cotswolds and then with the Royal Artillery travelling orchestra, which he conducted. He married Elizabeth Westman in 1944 and they had four daughters.

After the war, the couple moved to Ampfield, Hampshire and in 1949 to Bucklebury, Berkshire, where he lived at Bucklebury Lodge, Chapel Row. There he devoted himself to composition, working from a studio hut in the garden. Visitors there included Sir Eugene Goossens, Edmund Rubbra, Deryck Cooke, Heather Harper and Myer Fredman.  While at Bucklebury Still composed The Ballad of the Bladebone Inn, an orchestral overture inspired by the pub close to his house. Describing a tale explaining the name and sign of the pub, the composition's debut performance was at the Royal Festival Hall on 23 October 1957. Stanley Bayliss of The Musical Times described it as "duly bucolic" with "pleasant tunes", but said that it failed to send a "shiver down the spine." 

Much of his time in later life was spent giving free advice and lessons to students. His local friends included the composer Anthony Scott (1911-2000, Finzi's only pupil), painter and critic Adrian Stokes, the harpsichordist Michael Thomas (1922-1997) and Newbury Choral Society conductor and pianist John Russell.

As well as music, Still also considered becoming a Freudian lay psychoanalyst. This interest led him to form the London Imago Society in 1956, along with Adrian Stokes. An article by Still on the psychology of Gustav Mahler was published by The American Imago Society. Still presented a radio broadcast for the BBC on this subject in 1964. He also sat on a selection board for Berkshire Education Authority and advised prospective students over a period of 15 years.

Still died of a heart attack on 13 January 1971, having just been elected to the Executive Committee of the Composer's Guild. In an obituary, The Musical Times wrote of him as "a song writer of genuine lyrical impulse [who] set words by Byron, Keats and Shelley; he was also a symphonist, in a conservative vein." His widow Elizabeth died in 2008.

Music
Still's composition remained predominantly tonal, but with strong use of dissonance. Early in his career he wrote songs and a since-lost light opera for the Windsor Operatic Society, for which he was the conductor while still teaching at Eton. His compositions came to include many other songs, four symphonies, violin and piano concertos, four string quartets and other chamber music, three piano sonatas and an opera.

In the mid-1950s, Argo Records recorded a number of his chamber works, including the Quintet for three flutes, violin & cello and the Viola Sonata No 2. His Third Symphony (1960) was submitted to the University of Oxford in 1963, after being championed by Sir Eugene Goossens, the conductor. This earned him an Oxford doctorate in music. Goossens recorded the Symphony in 1966. The single movement Symphony No 4 was composed in 1964 and also recorded, conducted by Myer Fredman.

The four string quartets were recorded by the Villiers Quartet in 2013-14. They show a stylist journey from the pre-classical and folk-song models of the first two (only Number 1 was performed during the composer's lifetime and was premiered in 1948), to the "without key" polytonality of the second two, which date from the 1960s and show the influence of Bartok and Schoenberg, and of Hans Keller, whose advice Still sought out at this period.

Following his death in 1971 his work was neglected. The BBC broadcast his Concerto for String Orchestra in 1979 and his Elegie for baritone, chorus and orchestra in 1990. (The Elegie, originally written for the Newbury Choral Society, is a setting of Matthew Arnold's poem 'A Summer Night'). A number of earlier recordings from the 1960s and 1970s were revived for his centenary in 2010. The "fearsomely difficult" Violin Concerto was revived on 18 May 2013 in Ealing, London.

An archive is held at the Jerwood Library of the Performing Arts in Greenwich.

Selected works

Orchestral
 Symphony No 1 in C (1954)
 The Ballad of Bladebourne Inn, overture (1956)
 Symphony No 2 (1956)
 Symphony No 3 in C major (1960)
 Concerto for Strings (1964)
 Symphony No 4 (Sinfonia) (1964)
 Violin Concerto (1969)
 Piano Concerto (1970)

Choral
 Elegy (also Elegie) for baritone, chorus and orchestra (1963-4)

Opera
 Oedipus, libretto Adrian Stokes (1950s)

Chamber music
 String Quartet No 1 in A minor (1948)
 String Quartet No 2 in D major
 String Quartet No 3, "without key" (1960s)
 String Quartet No 4, "without key" (1960s)
 Cello Sonata in D minor
 Clarinet Quintet
 Oboe Quartet
 Oboe Sonatina
 Piano Quintet in F major
 Quintet for three flutes, violin and cello
 Trio in D minor for flute, cello and piano
 Trio in A for clarinet, violin and piano (fp 1964)
 Viola Sonata No 2
 Viola Sonata No 2
 Violin Sonata

Piano
 Piano Sonata No 1 in B major (fp 1969)
 Piano Sonata No 2 in G major
 Piano Sonata No 3 in C (fp 1971)

Songs
 August (Masefield)
 Awaiting Execution (Chidiock Tichbourne)
 Beauty Bathing (Munday)
 The Kingfisher (W H Davies)
 Ode to a Skylark (Shelley)
 Shall I, wasting in despair? (George Wither)
 Song of Pain and Beauty (Gurney)
 The Song of the Sirens (Thomas Browne)
 Sonnet (Keats)
 Sunset on the Morea (Byron)
 The sea hath many thousand sands (Anon.)
 To Julia (Herrick)
 Upon Julia's Clothes (Herrick)
 When I am dead, my dearest'' (C. Rossetti)

Notes

References

External links
Still's setting of the Lord's Prayer
A biographical account by the composer's wife, Elizabeth Still
 Robert Still archive, British Music Society catalogue

 Violin Concerto, third movement, Efi Christodoulou, Ealing Symphony Orchestra, cond. John Gibbons

20th-century classical composers
English classical composers
English opera composers
Male opera composers
English conductors (music)
British male conductors (music)
Alumni of Trinity College, Oxford
People educated at Eton College
Musicians from London
People from Bucklebury
1910 births
1971 deaths
Military personnel from London
20th-century British conductors (music)
20th-century English composers
English male classical composers
20th-century British male musicians
British Army personnel of World War II
Royal Artillery personnel